Nectandra warmingii is a species of plant in the family Lauraceae. It is endemic to savanna regions of Bahia and Minas Gerais states in Brazil.

References

warmingii
Endemic flora of Brazil
Flora of Bahia
Flora of Minas Gerais
Near threatened flora of South America
Taxa named by Carl Meissner
Taxonomy articles created by Polbot